WD repeat and SOCS box-containing protein 1 is a protein that in humans is encoded by the WSB1 gene.

This gene encodes a member of the WD-protein subfamily. This protein shares a high sequence identity to mouse and chick proteins. It contains several WD-repeats spanning most of the protein and an SOCS box in the C-terminus. Alternatively spliced transcript variants encoding distinct isoforms have been found for this gene.

References

Further reading